Vyozhki is a rural locality (a village) in Moshokskoye Rural Settlement, Sudogodsky District, Vladimir Oblast, Russia. The population was 51 as of 2010.

Geography 
Vyozhki is located 50 km east of Sudogda (the district's administrative centre) by road. Sinitsino is the nearest rural locality.

References 

Rural localities in Sudogodsky District